Caroline Costello is an Irish judge who has served as a Judge of the Court of Appeal since November 2018. She previously served as a Judge of the High Court from 2014 to 2018.

Costello graduated with a BA in Classics and History from University College Dublin in 1982. She subsequently attended the University of Oxford and the King's Inns. She became a barrister in 1988 and a senior counsel in 2010. She had a commercial oriented practice, focusing on commercial law, banking law and insolvency law.

She was appointed to the High Court in September 2014. She presided over High Court bankruptcy proceedings involving Seán Dunne. She served a term as chair of the judicial wing of INSOL Europe, a federation of insolvency lawyers. In 2018, she made a reference to the Court of Justice of the European Union arising out of an action taken by Max Schrems regarding the EU–US Privacy Shield.

She was made a Judge of the Court of Appeal in November 2018. Her appointment to the Court of Appeal along with Isobel Kennedy resulted in the first Irish court with a gender balanced number of judges.

She is the daughter of the former Attorney General of Ireland and President of the High Court Declan Costello and the granddaughter of
former Taoiseach John A. Costello.

References

Living people
Alumni of University College Dublin
Judges of the Court of Appeal (Ireland)
High Court judges (Ireland)
21st-century Irish judges
20th-century Irish lawyers
Irish women judges
Alumni of the University of Oxford
Year of birth missing (living people)
Alumni of King's Inns
21st-century women judges